Videofilm International (1988) Ltd. is a privately owned family business managed by Ami and Gili Bachar. The company was founded in 1981 and since then has provided subtitles production services for films and TV series as well as dubbing services from a variety of clients in Israel and abroad. The goal of the company's founders was to put to use their vast experience in the use of innovative technologies in the post-production field. Today, Videofilm International is a key player in the subtitle production and dubbing industry in Israel, and has achieved international recognition.

The company's managers and the employees in each of the different departments are very experienced in the television profession.

The company's services include:
Subtitle production for movies & TV Series
Subtitle production from any language to any language 
Production of Hebrew dubbing for children's programs
Production of Hebrew dubbing for films
Production of Russian dubbing for films and TV series
Production of narration in all languages
Editing and sound services

Dubbing studios
Recording studios in Israel